Daugavgrīva Castle (or Ust`-Dvinsk) is a former monastery converted into a castle, located at Vecdaugava oxbow on right bank of Daugava, in the northern part of Riga city, Latvia. Nowadays here are seen only earthen ramparts.

History
The first settlement, Daugavgrīva Abbey, was established on the right bank of the Daugava river, 13 miles from Bishop Albert of Riga's residence in Riga, by Cistercian monks from Pforta in 1205. Theoderich von Treyden was an early abbot, while during the 1210s Count Bernhard II of Lippe was its abbot. During a raid of tribal Curonians in 1228,<ref>See the Livonian Chronicle by Hermann de Wartberge, as cited here.</ref> the monastery and its tombs were destroyed, although the monks rebuilt the abbey after fighting died down. They also had to endure abuse by the undisciplined crusaders of the Livonian Order. Those knights were defeated at the Battle of Saule, however, and their remnants were incorporated into the Teutonic Knights in 1237. Until 1452 the territory of Siggelkow in Mecklenburg was owned by the monastery. In 1305, the local abbot sold the monastery to the Livonian Branch of the Teutonic Knights, who began construction of the fortress of Dünamünde.

In 1329, the knights' castle was taken by the burghers of Riga, who were forced to return it to the knights in 1435. In 1481, the knights closed the Daugava to navigation by stretching an iron chain from Dünamünde to the opposite riverbank, thus hoping to ruin Riga's trade. In retaliation the citizens of Riga captured Dünamünde and destroyed it. The knights returned to rebuild the stronghold eight years later. Because Riga itself was controlled by the Archbishops, the local administrative seat (Komturei'') of the monastic state of the Teutonic Knights was located in Dünamünde.

In 1561 during the Livonian War, Dünamünde became part of the Grand Duchy of Lithuania and afterwards of the Polish–Lithuanian Commonwealth.

The Skanstnieki homestead was built inside the ramparts in the 19th century.

See also
 List of castles in Latvia
 Daugavgrīva
 Capture of Daugavgrīva (1608)
 Battle of Daugavgriva (1609)

References

Sources

External links
 
  The fortress of Daugavgriva with contemporary illustrations
 Daugavgrīva Castle history on Ambermarks website  
  The fortress of Daugavgriva on 1201 website
  Discussion and pictures  on Fortification website

Buildings and structures completed in 1205
Castles of the Livonian Order
Castles in Latvia
Buildings and structures in Riga